is a Rinzai Buddhist temple in Higashiyama-ku Kyoto, Japan.  Owing to the influence of the Ashikaga, Manju-ji was designated a Jissatsu temple for a time.  At present, it is a sub-temple of Tōfuku-ji. It is considered to be one of the so-called Kyoto Gozan or "five great Zen temples of Kyoto".

History

Manju-ji was founded in the middle Heian period (late 13th century). In 1305,  (1235–1308)  was appointed abbot of Manju-ji.

Artwork
An artistically noteworthy Amida figure is too large to be moved from Manju-ji for display elsewhere.  The temple holds a collection of esoteric Buddhist art which was traditionally used in teaching the salient points in the story of the life of Gautama Buddha.

See also
List of Buddhist temples
List of Buddhist temples in Kyoto
 For an explanation of terms concerning Japanese Buddhism, Japanese Buddhist art, and Japanese Buddhist temple architecture, see the Glossary of Japanese Buddhism.

Notes

References 
 Baroni, Helen Josephine. (2002).  The Illustrated Encyclopedia of Zen Buddhism. New York: Rosen Publishing Group. ;  OCLC 42680558
 Dumoulin, Heinrich. (2005).  Zen Buddhism: A History (Vol. II: Japan). Bloomington, Indiana: World Wisdom. 
  Iwao, Seiichi, Teizō Iyanaga, Susumu Ishii, Shōichirō Yoshida, et al. (2002).  Dictionnaire historique du Japon. Paris: Maisonneuve & Larose. ;  OCLC 51096469
 Ponsonby-Fane, Richard Arthur Brabazon. (1956).  Kyoto: The Old Capital of Japan, 794-1869. Kyoto: The Ponsonby Memorial Society.

Buddhist temples in Kyoto
Tōfuku-ji temples